The Miel I Dam, officially known as the Patángoras Dam, is a gravity dam on La Miel River just south of Norcasia in Caldas Department, Colombia. The dam was constructed between 1997 and 2002 for the primary purpose of hydroelectric power generation. At the time of its completion, the dam was the tallest roller-compacted concrete (RCC) dam in the world but was surpassed by the Longtan Dam in 2009.

Background
Designs for the dam were drawn up in 1992 and 1993 before bidding was carried out in December of that same year. An RCC design was chosen to reduce costs and risks associated with excavating a larger foundation for an arch dam. Funding was acquired for the project by December 1997 when construction began. The power plant was operational in 2002 and the project was completed in 59 months, seven months ahead of time. The dam is part of the Miel I Hydroelectric Station and is officially called the Patángoras Dam but is commonly referred to as the Miel I Dam.

The U.S. Army Corps of Engineers was involved in the testing of the concrete for the dam. Drums of aggregates, cement, sand and soil were shipped to their North Pacific Division Materials Laboratory in Troutdale, Oregon. The materials were separated and tested for various properties. RCC concrete cylinders and beams were batched and poured. Tests were performed, for 7, 28, 90, 180 and 365 days. Tests included compressive strength, tensile strength, expansion, and slow load beams. The testing required almost 2 years to complete.

Design
It is located just east of the confluence of the Moro and La Miel Rivers.

Amani Reservoir
On the left bank of the reservoir near the dam is the intake for the Miel I Hydroelectric Station which is controlled by two floodgates. In 2010 the Guarinó diversion dam on the Guarinó River was opened and the Manso diversion dam on the Manso River began operations in 2013. Both divert water into the Amani Reservoir through tunnels.

Miel I Hydroelectric Power Plant
The Miel I Hydroelectric Power Plant receives water from the dam via a  diameter tunnel which splits into three  diameter penstocks before reaching each turbine. The power house is located underground and contains a machine, transformer and surge tank chambers.

See also

List of power stations in Colombia

References

Dams in Colombia
Gravity dams
Dams completed in 2002
Buildings and structures in Caldas Department
Roller-compacted concrete dams
2002 establishments in Colombia
Energy infrastructure completed in 2002
Underground power stations